Chris Watson (1867–1941) served as the third Prime Minister of Australia.

Chris or Christopher Watson may also refer to:
Chris Watson (American football) (born 1977), former American football player
 Chris Watson (basketball) (born 1975), American-Israeli basketball player
Chris Watson (musician) (born 1952), sound recordist specialising in natural history, founding member of the band Cabaret Voltaire
Chris Watson (singer) (born 1969), British tenor
Christopher Watson (translator) (died 1581), English historian and translator
Christopher Watson, U.S. Marine in the 2011 Helmand Province incident